Joyce Bennett (Sala Tenna) (born 11 May 1945 in Guildford, Western Australia) is a former Australian sprinter.

At the 1962 British Empire and Commonwealth Games in Perth she won silver in the 220 Yards and gold in the 4 × 110 yards relay. Four years later at the 1966 British Empire and Commonwealth Games in Kingston she defended her title in the 4 × 110 yards relay.

She participated in the 1964 Summer Olympics (half-final in the 200 m, sixth in the 4 × 100 metres relay) and in the 1968 Summer Olympics (heat in the 400 m, fifth in the 4 × 100 metres relay).

References

External links 
 Profile at Australian Athletics Historical Results
 Profile at trackfield.brinkster.net
 

1945 births
Australian female sprinters
Olympic athletes of Australia
Athletes (track and field) at the 1964 Summer Olympics
Athletes (track and field) at the 1968 Summer Olympics
Athletes (track and field) at the 1962 British Empire and Commonwealth Games
Athletes (track and field) at the 1966 British Empire and Commonwealth Games
Commonwealth Games silver medallists for Australia
Commonwealth Games gold medallists for Australia
Commonwealth Games medallists in athletics
Living people
Olympic female sprinters
20th-century Australian women
21st-century Australian women
Medallists at the 1962 British Empire and Commonwealth Games
Medallists at the 1966 British Empire and Commonwealth Games